Hermann Witsius (Herman Wits or in Latin Hermannus Witsius; 12 February 1636 – 22 October 1708, aged 72) was a Dutch theologian.

Life 
He was born at Enkhuizen. He studied at the University of Groningen, Leiden, and Utrecht. He was ordained in the ministry, becoming the pastor of Westwoud in 1656 and afterwards at Wormer, Goes, and Leeuwarden. He became professor of divinity successively at the University of Franeker in 1675 and at the University of Utrecht in 1680. Witsius became Chancellor of Utrecht University in 1686. In 1698 he was appointed to the University of Leiden as the successor of the younger Friedrich Spanheim. He died in Leiden.

Views 
While in his theology Witsius aimed at a reconciliation between the reigning orthodoxy and Covenant Theology (also known as federalism), he was first of all a Biblical theologian, his principal field being systematic theology. His chief work is entitled The Economy of the Covenants between God and Man (originally published in Latin: De oeconomia foederum Dei cum hominibus, Leeuwarden, 1677). He was induced to publish this work by his grief at the controversies between Voetians and Cocceians. Although himself a member of the federalistic school, he was in no way blind to the value of the scholastically established dogmatic system of the Church. In the end, he did not succeed in pleasing either party.

Works 
  (originally published as ).
 .

Besides his principal work he published:
 .
 .
 .
 
 , 2 vols.
 
 .
 .
 .

Of his minor works, there have appeared in English 
A Treatise on Christian Faith (London, 1761); 
An Essay on the Use and Abuse of Reason in Matters of Religion, Trans. John Carter, Norwich, 1795 (New Edition, CrossReach Publications, 2016)
On the Character of a True Theologian (Edinburgh, 1877); and 
 .  
 ; Translation of 
Sacred Dissertations: On what is Commonly Called the Apostles' Creed (Volume 1) (1823) 
https://archive.org/details/sacreddissertat02witsgoog 
https://archive.org/details/sacreddissertat00witsgoog
Sacred Dissertations: On what is Commonly Called the Apostles' Creed (Volume 2) (1823) 
https://archive.org/details/sacreddissertat01witsgoog
https://archive.org/details/sacreddissertat03witsgoog
Conciliatory or irenical animadversions on the controversies agitated in Britain : under the unhappy names of antinomians and neonomians (1807) 
 .

References

External links 
 .
 .
 
 

1636 births
1708 deaths
Dutch Calvinist and Reformed theologians
17th-century Dutch Calvinist and Reformed ministers
People from Enkhuizen
University of Groningen alumni
Leiden University alumni
Utrecht University alumni
Academic staff of the University of Franeker
Academic staff of Leiden University
Academic staff of Utrecht University
17th-century Calvinist and Reformed theologians